Edward Aczel is a British stand-up comedian known for his "anti-comedy" style of clumsy delivery presenting as uninterested and lacking belief in both his material and performing skills.

His 2008 Edinburgh Fringe Festival show, "Do I Really Have to Communicate with You?", was described by Zadie Smith in The New Yorker as "one of the strangest, and finest, hours of live comedy I’d ever seen". James Kettle in The Guardian called him "perhaps Britain's greatest living anti-comedian".

Winner of the 2008 Malcolm Hardee Award, he was the runner-up in the 2005 BBC New Comedy Awards and in Jimmy Carr's Comedy Idol (which was filmed for the extras on Jimmy Carr's 2005 live DVD).

His 2010 Edinburgh show featured in the BBC Comedy Collection.

In 2020, he appeared in an episode of the soap opera EastEnders.

References

External links
 Edward Aczel on Chortle
 Edward Aczel on The British Comedy Guide
 Edward Aczel on Comedy CV

Living people
English male comedians
20th-century births
21st-century English comedians
Year of birth missing (living people)